Sir John Fenwick, 3rd Baronet (c. 1645 – 28 January 1697) was an English Jacobite conspirator, who succeeded to the Baronetcy of Fenwick on the death of his father in 1676. He was involved in a Jacobite plot to assassinate the monarch. He was beheaded in 1697.

Life
Fenwick was the eldest son of Sir William Fenwick, or Fenwicke, a member of an old Northumberland family. He entered the army, becoming major-general in 1688, but before this date, he had been returned in succession to his father as one of the Members of Parliament for Northumberland, which county he represented from 1677 to 1687. He was a strong partisan of King James II, and in 1685 was one of the principal supporters of the act of attainder against the Duke of Monmouth; but he remained in England when William III ascended the throne in the Revolution of 1688.

He had financial problems and in 1688 he sold the rump of the family estates and Wallington Hall to Sir William Blackett for £4,000 and an annuity of £2,000 a year. The annuity was to be paid for his lifetime and that of his wife, Mary. Blackett was happy with the deal as he discovered lead on the land and he became rich.

Fenwick began to plot against the new King William, for which he underwent a short imprisonment in 1689 from May to October. Renewing his plots on his release, he publicly insulted Queen Mary in 1691, and it is practically certain that he was implicated in the schemes for assassinating William which came to light in 1695 and 1696. After the seizure of his fellow conspirators, Robert Charnock and others, he remained in hiding until the imprudent conduct of his friends in attempting to induce one of the witnesses against him to leave the country led to his arrest in June 1696.

To save himself he offered to reveal all he knew about the Jacobite conspiracies; but his confession was a farce, being confined to charges against some of the leading Whig noblemen, which were damaging, but not conclusive. By this time his friends had succeeded in removing one of the two witnesses, and in these circumstances, it was thought that the charge of treason must fail. The government, however, overcame this difficulty by introducing a bill of attainder. After a long and acrimonious discussion the bill passed through both Houses of Parliament (Act 8 & 9 Will. III c. 4), finding Fenwick guilty of high treason, punishable by death. His wife, Mary, persevered in her attempts to save his life, but her efforts were fruitless, and Fenwick was beheaded in London on 28 January 1697, with the same formalities as were usually observed at the execution of a peer. He was the last person ever executed under an Act of Attainder.

By his wife, Mary (d. 1708), daughter of Charles Howard, 1st Earl of Carlisle, and his wife Anne Howard, he had three sons and one daughter, all of whom died young, and are buried with Fenwick at St Martin-in-the-Fields.

Macaulay says that of all the Jacobites, the most desperate characters not excepted, he (Fenwick) was the only one for whom William felt an intense personal aversion. Fenwick's hatred of the king is said to date from the time when he was serving in Holland, and was reprimanded by William, then Prince of Orange. A horse, White Sorrel, owned by Fenwick was among items of his estate confiscated by the Crown on his attainder and a fall from that horse was partly responsible for William's death. The horse purportedly stumbled when it stepped on a molehill. In recognition of this, the Jacobites' secret toast was to 'The little Gentleman in Black Velvet.' He is also commemorated in the folk tune Sir John Fenwick's The Flower Among Them All.

His wife had a memorial created for him in York Cathedral and she was buried there after she died on 27 October 1708.

Notes

References
 
 
Attribution
 
 

1640s births
1697 deaths
3rd Dragoon Guards officers
Baronets in the Baronetage of England
English Jacobites
English generals
17th-century soldiers
English MPs 1661–1679
English MPs 1679
English MPs 1680–1681
English MPs 1681
English MPs 1685–1687
People executed by Stuart England by decapitation
People executed under the Stuarts for treason against England
Executed English people
17th-century English criminals
English politicians convicted of crimes